Tonal may refer to:

 Tonal (mythology), a concept in the belief systems and traditions of Mesoamerican cultures, involving a spiritual link between a person and an animal
 Tonal language, a type of language in which pitch is used to make phonemic distinctions
 Tonality, a system of writing music involving the relationship of pitch to some centered key
 Tonal system, a hexadecimal (base 16) system of notation, arithmetic, and metrology proposed by Nystrom in 1859
 "Tonal", a song by the American band Bright from the album The Albatross Guest House

See also
Tone (disambiguation)